Jan Salomon (Mars) Cramer (28 April 1928 – 15 March 2014) was a Dutch economist, Professor of Statistics and Econometrics at the University of Amsterdam, known for his work of empirical econometrics.

Biography 

In the 1950s Cramer started his career as researcher for the Bureau for Economic Policy Analysis. After graduation in 1961 at the University of Amsterdam he was appointed Professor of Econometrics, a newly established chair. He was Director of the SEO Economic Research from 1985 to 1992 as successor of Wim Driehuis. Among his doctoral students were Arnold Merkies	(1972), Geert Ridder (1987) and Mirjam van Praag (2005).

In 1980 Cramer was elected member of the Royal Netherlands Academy of Arts and Sciences, and later Fellow of the Tinbergen Institute. Cramer died on 15 March 2014 in Amsterdam 

The University of Amsterdam's Faculty of Economics and Business (2014) recalled that "Mars was known for his originality and his wit. He possessed a genuine academic curiosity and a rather characteristic style of writing. For example, his research into the velocity of money led him to study the velocity of particular coins. As a student he served as editor of the literary student periodical Propria Cures, and he continued to intermittently publish short stories and opinion pieces. In 2012, the Washington Post published his moving account of his wife Til’s euthanasia four years earlier." Cramer "continued working on new research projects and contributing to the supervision of students until the very last day before his passing."

Publications 
Cramer authored and co-authored numerous publications in the field of econometrics. Books, a selection:
 1958. Economic forecasts and policy. With Henri Theil assisted by J.S. Cramer, H. Moerman, and A. Russchen.
 1961. A Statistical Model of the Ownership of Major Consumer Durables with an Application to some Findings of the 1953 Oxford Savings Survey.
 1969. Empirical econometrics. Amsterdam : North-Holland Pub. Co.
 1991. The logit model: an introduction for economists. London: Edward Arnold.
 2003. Logit models from economics and other fields. Cambridge University Press, 2003.

Articles, a selection:

References

External links 
 In memoriam: Mars Cramer on uva.nl

1928 births
2014 deaths
Dutch economists
Dutch mathematicians
Members of the Royal Netherlands Academy of Arts and Sciences
University of Amsterdam alumni
Academic staff of the University of Amsterdam
Writers from The Hague
Fellows of the Econometric Society